Shahbazpur or Shahbajpur or Shahabajpur can refer to places:

In Bangladesh
 Shahbazpur Union, an area of Shibganj Upazila, Chapai Nawabganj District
 Shahbazpur Union, Sarail, an area of Sarail Upazila, Brahmanbaria District
 Shahbazpur, Brahmanbaria, a village in Shahbazpur Union, Sarail
 Two areas of Barlekha Upazila in Maulvibazar District
 Dakshin Shahbazpur Union
 Uttar Shahbajpur Union
 A channel of the Meghna River that empties into the sea in Bhola District
 Bhola Island, also called Dakshin Shahbazpur Island, in Bhola District

In India
 Shahbazpur, Bihar, a village in Araria district
 A village in Mandawar, Uttar Pradesh

In Pakistan
 Shahbazpur (village), a village in Gujrat District